Isiah Lord Thomas III (born April 30, 1961), also known as "Zeke", is an American former professional basketball player and coach who is an analyst for NBA TV. The 12-time NBA All-Star was named one of the 50 Greatest Players in NBA History as well as the 75 Greatest Players, and inducted into the Naismith Memorial Basketball Hall of Fame. He played his entire professional career for the Detroit Pistons of the National Basketball Association (NBA). Thomas is widely regarded as one of the greatest players and point guards of all time.

Thomas played college basketball for the Indiana Hoosiers, leading them to the 1981 NCAA championship as a sophomore and declaring for the NBA draft. He was taken as the second overall pick by the Pistons in the 1981 NBA draft, and played for them his entire career, while leading the "Bad Boys" to the 1988–89 and 1989–90 NBA championships.

After his playing career, he was an executive with the Toronto Raptors, a television commentator, an executive with the Continental Basketball Association, head coach of the Indiana Pacers, and an executive and head coach for the New York Knicks. He was later the men's basketball coach for the Florida International University (FIU) Golden Panthers for three seasons from 2009 to 2012. In early May 2015, amidst controversy, Thomas was named president and part owner of the Knicks' WNBA sister team, the New York Liberty, subsequent to the re-hiring of Thomas's former Pistons teammate, Bill Laimbeer, as the team's coach.

Early life
The youngest of nine children, Thomas was born on April 30, 1961, in Chicago, Illinois, and grew up in the city's West Side. He started playing basketball at age three and would dribble and shoot baskets as the halftime entertainment at Catholic Youth Organization games.

He attended Our Lady of Sorrows School and St. Joseph High School in Westchester, which was a 90-minute commute from his home. Playing under coach Gene Pingatore, he led St. Joseph to the state finals in his junior year and was considered one of the top college prospects in the country.

College career

Thomas was recruited to play college basketball for Bob Knight and the Indiana Hoosiers. Although he received mail saying Knight tied up his players and beat them, he did not believe the rumors. When Knight visited the Thomas home, one of Isiah's brothers, who wanted him to attend DePaul, embarrassed him by insulting the Indiana coach and engaging him in a shouting match. Nevertheless, Thomas's mother chose Knight and Indiana because she felt that getting away to Bloomington would be good for her son, as would Knight's discipline.

Thomas quickly had to adjust to Knight's disciplinarian style. At the 1979 Pan American Games in Puerto Rico, Knight got so mad at Thomas he threatened to put him on a plane home. Knight recalled yelling at the freshman-to-be, "You ought to go to DePaul, Isiah, because you sure as hell aren't going to be an Indiana player playing like that." Prior to the start of his freshman year, the 1979–80 season, Knight became so upset with Thomas that he kicked him out of a practice. According to Thomas, Knight was making a point that no player, no "matter how talented, is bigger than Knight's philosophy."

Thomas quickly proved his skills as a player and became a favorite with both Knight and Indiana fans. His superior abilities eventually caused Knight to adjust his coaching style. Fans displayed bedsheets with quotations from the Book of Isaiah ("And a little child shall lead them") and nicknamed him "Mr. Wonderful." Thomas and Mike Woodson led the Hoosiers to the Big Ten championship and advanced to the 1980 Sweet Sixteen.

The next year, the 1980–81 season, Knight made Thomas captain and told him to run the show on the floor. Thomas responded so well that, as the season unfolded, Knight and Thomas grew as friends. When a Purdue player took a cheap shot at Thomas during a game at Bloomington, Knight called a press conference to defend his star. And 19 days later, when Thomas hit an Iowa player and was ejected from a game, Knight refused to criticize him.

That year, Thomas and the Hoosiers once again won a conference title and won the 1981 NCAA tournament, the school's fourth national title. The sophomore earned the tournament's Most Outstanding Player award and made himself eligible for the upcoming NBA draft.

Professional career

Detroit Pistons (1981–1994) 

In the 1981 NBA draft, the Detroit Pistons chose Thomas with the second overall pick and signed him to a four-year, $1.6 million contract. Thomas started for the Eastern Conference in the 1982 NBA All-Star Game and made the All-Rookie Team.

On December 13, 1983, Thomas scored 47 points and recorded 17 assists during a 186–184 triple overtime win over the Denver Nuggets. In the opening round of the 1984 NBA playoffs, Thomas and the Pistons faced off against Bernard King and the New York Knicks. In the pivotal fifth game, Thomas scored 16 points in 94 seconds to force the game into overtime, but then fouled out, and the Knicks held on to win.

In the 1985 NBA playoffs, Thomas and his team went to the conference semifinals against the 15-time NBA champion Boston Celtics led by future Hall of Famers Larry Bird, Kevin McHale, Robert Parish, and Dennis Johnson. Detroit would not shake the Celtics in their six-game series, eventually losing.

In the 1987 NBA playoffs, Thomas and the Pistons went to the Eastern Conference Finals and faced the Celtics again. It was the furthest the team had advanced since moving from Fort Wayne. Detroit tied the Celtics at two games apiece, but its hope of winning Game 5 at Boston Garden was dashed by Larry Bird with just seconds remaining: Thomas attempted to quickly inbound the ball, Bird stole the pass and hit Dennis Johnson for the game-winning layup.

In 1988, the Pistons finally defeated the Celtics in the Eastern Conference Finals and advanced to their first Finals in 32 years, where they faced the Los Angeles Lakers, led by Magic Johnson, James Worthy, and Kareem Abdul-Jabbar. Before the series, Thomas and Johnson exchanged a courtside kiss on the cheek prior to tip-off as a sign of their deep friendship. After taking a 3–2 series lead back to Los Angeles, Detroit appeared poised to win their first NBA title in Game 6.

One of Thomas's most inspiring and self-defining moments came in Game 6. Although he had severely sprained his ankle late in the game, Thomas continued to play. While hobbling and in obvious pain, Thomas scored 25 points in the third quarter, an NBA Finals record. But the Lakers won the game 103–102 on a pair of last-minute free throws by Abdul-Jabbar, following a controversial foul called on Bill Laimbeer. With Thomas unable to compete at full strength, the Lakers were able to take advantage and clinched their second consecutive title in Game 7, 108–105.

In the 1988–89 season, Thomas, along with teammates Joe Dumars, Rick Mahorn, Vinnie Johnson, Dennis Rodman, James Edwards, John Salley, Bill Laimbeer, and Mark Aguirre, guided his team to a 63–19 record. Detroit played a brash and dominating brand of basketball through the playoffs that led to their nickname "Bad Boys". First, they defeated Boston, which had been suffering persistent injuries. After being down 2–1 against Michael Jordan and the up-and-coming Chicago Bulls in the Conference Finals, the Pistons utilized the Jordan Rules to limit Jordan's impact, which allowed them to defeat the Bulls in six games and advance to the finals yet again, setting up an NBA Finals rematch with the Lakers. This time the Pistons dominated, sweeping the Lakers in four games to win their first of back-to-back championships.
 
In the 1989–90 season, Thomas and the Pistons had another dominant run. They finished the regular season as the #1 seed for the second straight year. After sweeping the Pacers and defeating the Knicks in five games, Thomas and the Pistons faced a tough seven game series against the Bulls in the Eastern Conference Finals. Fortunately, the Pistons prevailed and advanced to their third straight finals. The Pistons repeated as champions, by defeating Clyde Drexler's Portland Trail Blazers. Thomas was voted NBA Finals Most Valuable Player of the 1990 NBA Finals after averaging 27.6 points, 7.0 assists, and 5.2 rebounds per game.

The 1990–91 season proved to be a struggle, as the team went through some injuries, with Thomas only playing 49 games in the regular season because of a wrist injury. The Pistons would win 50 games. Despite advancing to the Eastern Conference Finals, they were no match for a more developed and determined Bulls who swept the two time defending champions. In the last 7.9 seconds of Game 4, Thomas and most of his teammates walked off the court without shaking any of the Bulls' hands.

In 1992, the Pistons made it to the playoffs, but were eliminated in five games by the New York Knicks in the first round. In 1993, the Pistons won just 40 games, missing the playoffs for the first time since the 1982–83 season. In the following season, an aging and ailing Thomas tore his Achilles tendon on April 19, 1994, forcing him to retire a month later.

National team career
Thomas was selected to the 1980 Olympic U.S. basketball team, but like all American athletes, he was not able to play in Moscow due to the Olympics boycott. The boycotting countries instead participated in the "Gold Medal Series", a series of games against NBA teams, a French team and the 1976 Olympic gold medal team in various U.S. cities, recording a 5–1 record (losing only to the Seattle SuperSonics). Thomas shot 22–55 from the field and 14–17 from the line. He led the U.S. in assists with 37 (the next highest total on the team was 17) and averaged 9.7 points per game. In 2007, Thomas received one of 461 Congressional Gold Medals created especially for the spurned athletes.

Despite his talent, Thomas was left off the original Olympic Dream Team, possibly as a result of an alleged feud with Michael Jordan. In the book When the Game Was Ours, Magic Johnson relates that he, Jordan and other players conspired to keep Thomas off the Dream Team.

After Tim Hardaway left the team due to injury, Thomas was named to Dream Team II for the 1994 World Championship of Basketball, but did not play due to his Achilles tendon injury that eventually led to his retirement. He was replaced by Kevin Johnson.

Post-playing career

Businessman
Isiah Thomas is the founding Chairman and CEO of Isiah International LLC, a holding company with a diverse portfolio of business ventures and investments. Gre3n Waste Removal, Re3 Recycling, and Eleven Capital Group are three of the primary businesses in the Isiah International family of companies.

In addition to these business ventures, Thomas is involved in real estate projects in Chicago and the surrounding region as the owner of Isiah Real Estate. Thomas said he is putting money in distressed areas and reinvesting: "I'm hoping I can be a catalyst for change in those areas, to get the population back into those communities and be a catalyst to make a difference." Thomas is also involved in a $300 million development deal for a mixed-use complex at the Illinois Medical District Commission. Isiah Real Estate partnered with Higgins Development Partners, Thomas Samuels Enterprises, and East Lake Management & Development to develop  of land that would include retail space, a hotel, apartments and parking areas.

Thomas's business career began during his career with the Pistons. Planning for life after the NBA, Thomas invested in a host of ventures through his private investment company out of Michigan, Isiah Investments, LLC. His primary investment was a large chain of printing franchises, American Speedy Printing Centers Inc. Thomas took a very hands-on approach at American Speedy, helping lead the company out of bankruptcy to become profitable and one of the largest printing franchises in the world.

He was also one of the founding members of the advisory board for Marquis Jet Partners and a partner of Dale and Thomas Popcorn.

In April 1999 Thomas became the first African American elected to the Board of Governors of the Chicago Stock Exchange. He served until 2002.

Thomas often speaks to students and professionals around the country about his business experiences.

Thomas has served as CEO and Executive Chairman of the Board of Directors of One World Products, a cannabis company based in the U.S. with cultivation and processing facilities in Colombia.

Toronto Raptors
After retiring, Thomas became part owner and Executive Vice President for the expansion Toronto Raptors in 1994. In 1998, he left the organization after a dispute with new management over the franchise's direction and his future responsibilities. During his four-year tenure with the team, the Raptors drafted Damon Stoudamire, Marcus Camby, and high schooler Tracy McGrady.

Broadcasting
After leaving the Raptors, Thomas became a television commentator (first as the lead game analyst with play-by-play man Bob Costas and then as part of the studio team) for the NBA on NBC. He also worked a three-man booth with Costas and Doug Collins.

CBA
Thomas became the owner of the Continental Basketball Association (CBA) from 1998 to 2000. He founded Enlighten Sports Inc, a full-service web development group specializing in sports marketing, in 1999.

When at the Continental Basketball Association, Thomas launched partnerships with Enlighten Sports and the University of Colorado and the CBA. The new websites allowed fans to watch live game webcasts, use live shot charts, chat with players and more. Thomas said the internet was "and integral part of [the CBA's] strategy to provide engaging and entertaining content for fans." Thomas also launched a partnership between the CBA and SEASONTICKET.com to bring personalized video highlights and scores to fans across the country as well as be a portal for All-Star League voting. Thomas foresaw that streaming video would be the future of news and entertainment.

In 1998, Thomas founded a company serving consumers, retailers, and corporations with online gift certificates and other i-commerce products. Isiah.com also had a partnership with the NBA store.

Thomas purchased the CBA for $10 million, and in 2001 the league was forced into bankruptcy and folded, shortly after NBA Commissioner David Stern decided to create his own development league, the NBDL, to replace the CBA.

Indiana Pacers
From 2000 to 2003, Thomas coached the Indiana Pacers, succeeding Larry Bird, who previously coached the Pacers to the Eastern Conference title. Thomas attempted to bring up young talents such as Jermaine O'Neal, Jamaal Tinsley, Al Harrington, and Jeff Foster. But under Thomas the Pacers were not able to stay at the elite level as they went through the transition from a veteran-dominated, playoff-experienced team to a younger, less experienced team. In Thomas's first two seasons with the Pacers, the team was eliminated in the first round by the Philadelphia 76ers and the New Jersey Nets, both of whom eventually made the NBA Finals.

In his last year with the Pacers, Thomas guided them to a 48–34 record in the regular season and coached the Eastern Conference team at the 2003 NBA All-Star Game. As the third seed, the Pacers were eliminated in the first round of the playoffs by the sixth-seeded Boston Celtics. With blossoming talents such as Jermaine O'Neal, Brad Miller, Ron Artest, Al Harrington and Jamaal Tinsley, along with the veteran leadership of Reggie Miller, some perceived Thomas's lack of coaching experience as the Pacers' stumbling block. In the off-season, Bird returned to the Pacers as President of Basketball Operations, and his first act was to replace Thomas with Rick Carlisle.

New York Knicks
On December 22, 2003, the New York Knicks hired Thomas as President of Basketball Operations. Thomas was ultimately unsuccessful with the Knicks roster and fanbase. At the end of the 2005–06 season, the Knicks had the highest payroll in the league and the second-worst record. He traded away several future draft picks to Chicago in a deal for Eddy Curry including what turned out to be two lottery picks in talent-rich drafts, LaMarcus Aldridge, and Joakim Noah.

On June 22, 2006, the Knicks fired coach Larry Brown, and owner James Dolan replaced him with Thomas on the condition that he show "evident progress" or be fired.

During the following season the Knicks became embroiled in a brawl with the Denver Nuggets that Thomas allegedly instigated by ordering his players to commit a hard foul in the paint. He was not fined or suspended; NBA Commissioner David Stern said that he relied only on "definitive information" when handing out punishments. Later in the season, nine months after Dolan had demanded "evident progress", the Knicks re-signed Thomas to an undisclosed "multi-year" contract. After Thomas was granted the extension, the Knicks abruptly fell from playoff contention with a dismal finish to the season.

During the 2007 NBA draft, Thomas made another trade, acquiring Zach Randolph, Fred Jones, and Dan Dickau from the Portland Trail Blazers for Steve Francis and Channing Frye.

Thomas also compounded the Knicks' salary-cap problems by signing fringe players such as Jerome James and Jared Jeffries to full mid-level exception contracts. Neither player saw any significant playing time and both were often injured and highly ineffective when able to play.

Despite the constant criticism he received from Knicks fans, Thomas maintained that he had no intention of leaving until he turned the team around, and predicted he would lead the Knicks to a championship, stating that his goal was to leave behind a "championship legacy" with the Knicks, just as he had done for the Detroit Pistons. This prediction was met with widespread skepticism.

On April 2, 2008, Donnie Walsh was introduced to replace Thomas as President of Basketball Operations for the Knicks. Walsh did not comment definitively on whether Thomas would be retained in any capacity.

One night after the Knicks tied a franchise record of 59 losses and ended their season, news broke that in talks with Walsh the week before, Thomas had been told he would not return as Knicks head coach the following season. He was officially "reassigned" on April 18 "after a season of listless and dreadful basketball, a tawdry lawsuit and unending chants from fans demanding his dismissal." Thomas posted an overall winning percentage of .341 as head coach of the Knicks, fifth lowest in team history. As part of the reassignment agreement, Thomas was to serve as a consultant to the team, reporting directly to Walsh and banned from having contact with Knicks players on the rationale that he could undermine the new head coach.

FIU
On April 14, 2009, Thomas accepted an offer to become the head basketball coach of FIU, replacing Sergio Rouco after five losing seasons. Thomas announced that he would donate his first year's salary back to the school, saying, "I did not come here for the money."

After posting a 7–25 record in his first season at FIU, on August 6, 2010, Thomas announced that he was taking a job as consultant to the New York Knicks, while keeping his position as head coach at FIU. According to the New York Daily News, "nearly every major media outlet panned the announcement of Thomas' hire", and it led to a "public outcry" among fans. In a reversal on August 11, Thomas announced that he would not be working with the Knicks because holding both jobs violated NBA bylaws.

Thomas finished his second season at FIU with an 11–19 record (5–11 in conference games). On April 6, 2012, FIU fired Thomas after he went 26–65 in three seasons. Under Thomas, FIU never won more than 11 games in a season.

Back to broadcasting
On December 19, 2012, NBA TV announced that Thomas would begin work on December 21, 2012, as a member of the studio analyst panel. It was also announced that Thomas would become a regular contributor for NBA.com.

New York Liberty
On May 5, 2015, the WNBA New York Liberty hired Thomas as Team President, overseeing all of the franchise's business and basketball operations.

On June 22, 2015, the Liberty and the WNBA agreed to suspend consideration of Thomas's ownership application. He remained president of the team.

Under Thomas's leadership as team president and his former Pistons teammate Bill Laimbeer as head coach, the Liberty finished first in the Eastern Conference during the 2015 season.

Thomas was relieved of his duties on February 21, 2019, after James Dolan sold the Liberty to Joseph Tsai.  As his contract was with MSG, he continued to be paid until May of that year.

Cheurlin Champagne
In 2016, Thomas announced that he was the exclusive United States importer of the Cheurlin Champagne brand through ISIAH Imports, a subsidiary of ISIAH International, LLC. Cheurlin Champagne made its debut in the United States at the 2016 Democratic National Convention in Philadelphia. Other activations have included a private luncheon honoring former President Bill Clinton. Cheurlin recently debuted at The Palace of Auburn Hills for the final season of the Detroit Pistons at the historic arena. Cheurlin produces two champagne categories: Cheurlin's Brut Speciale and Rose de Saignee and Cheurlin Thomas's "Celebrite" Blanc de Blanc and "Le Champion" Blanc de Noir. In August 2017, Thomas brought his Cheurlin Flagship Collection portfolio of Champagnes to the Bellagio in Las Vegas.

Players Only
Since 2017, Thomas has been a regular panelist during NBA on TNT's Monday coverage Players Only, which features only former NBA players as studio analysts, play-by-play announcers, and color analysts for games.

Education
Thomas finished his college degree at Indiana University during the Pistons' off-seasons and received his Master's in Education from the UC Berkeley Graduate School of Education in 2013. At UC Berkeley, Thomas studied the connection between education and sports, specifically how American society makes education accessible (or inaccessible) to black male college athletes.

Philanthropic work
During his playing career, Thomas paid college tuition for more than 75 students. When he was a Piston, in 1987 Thomas organized the "No Crime Day" in Detroit. He even had the help of Detroit Mayor Coleman Young to call for a moratorium on crime in the summer of 1986.

Also in 1987 Thomas posed for a poster sponsored by the American Library Association with the caption "READ: Isiah Thomas for America's Libraries". Thomas is shown dressed in a Sam Spade type outfit while reading a detective novel.

Thomas founded Mary's Court, a foundation that supports economically disadvantaged parents and children in the communities of Garfield Park and Lawndale on the West Side of Chicago. The charity is named for Thomas's mother, who he credits with instilling in him the importance of hard work and giving back to the community. Mary's Court has teamed up with another Chicago-based charity, Kids off the Block, to serve meals to Chicago children and families during Thanksgiving.

While at FIU, Thomas and Mary's Court donated $50,000 to FIU's First Generation Scholarship and organized a sell-out charity game during the NBA lockout featuring NBA stars LeBron James and Dwyane Wade, with proceeds benefiting Mary's Court. A street on Chicago's West Side was named in honor of his mother.

The Dr. Martin Luther King Jr. Boys & Girls Club of Chicago recognized Thomas's philanthropic work in March 2012 and honored him with the organization's King Legacy Award at their 24th Annual King Legacy Awards Gala. The award is given annually to individuals who have fostered the principles of Dr. Martin Luther King Jr. through their community contributions.

In July 2012, Thomas joined The Black Men's Roundtable in Florida along with other national and local black leaders to discuss issues that directly affect black males.

The Peace League is an annual community basketball league that brings together young men and women from surrounding communities within the Chicago area and provides a safe haven growth and development; it was established by Thomas and Father Pfleger in 2011. In September 2012, Thomas co-hosted the Ballin' for Peace Tournament at St. Sabina Church in Chicago. He joined with Joakim Noah, Taj Gibson, Quentin Richardson, Zach Randolph, the Chicago Bears' J'Marcus Webb, pastor Father Michael Pfleger, and others to produce this event, in order to reduce gang violence through communication and basketball. Thomas also stressed the value of education for those in poverty.

The Peace League initiative has expanded into a program which now offers GED classes, employment training, and internship opportunities. The surrounding Auburn-Gresham neighborhood has seen a drastic drop in violence since the league began.

Most recently, the Peace League Tournament was expanded to New York City during the 2015 NBA All-Star Weekend. The New York City Peace Game featured over 50 players from across all five Boroughs that competed in a tournament as well as a brief speaking program with some special guests, supporters and participating organizations at the Harlem PAL that included Harry Belafonte of Sankofa.org, Help USA, Cure Violence, and Connor Sports.

In March 2013, Children Uniting Nations, an organization that focuses on advocacy/awareness and provides academic and community-based programs for at-risk and foster youth, presented Thomas and Mary's Court with the Lifetime Achievement Award for his passion and commitment to improving the lives of children.

In partnership with the Marillac Social Center, Thomas and Mary's Court hosted its Third Annual Holiday Toy Giveaway. Each year Mary's Court provides gifts, clothing and educational items to hundreds of children in Chicago at this signature event.

Humanity of Connection Award
On February 13, 2017, Thomas was presented the AT&T Humanity of Connection Award during its annual Black History Month celebration in honor of Lewis H. Latimer at the Smithsonian's National Museum of African American History and Culture in Washington, D.C. He was honored for his historic achievements in sports and his countless contributions to the African American community as a leader in the sports, business and philanthropic industries.

Personal life
Isiah Lord Thomas III was the son of Isiah II and Mary Thomas, the youngest of seven boys and two girls. Isiah's father was an army veteran wounded in the Battle of Saipan. He later attended trade school, eventually becoming the first black supervisor at International Harvester in Chicago. When the plant closed, the only work he could find was as a janitor and the family fell into hardship and Isiah II left when Isiah was a young child. Thomas grew up in the heart of Chicago's West Side ghetto. After his parents' separation, he lived with his mother. Born a Baptist, Mary turned the family toward Catholicism (and Our Lady of Sorrows Catholic Church and school).

Thomas was a basketball prodigy from age three and was tutored by his older brothers, some of whom were good players in their own right. Although most coaches in the Chicago area considered him too small to have any significant impact on a basketball program, Thomas's brothers persuaded coach Gene Pingatore of St. Joseph High School to arrange a sports scholarship for Isiah.

Thomas met his future wife, Lynn Kendall, the daughter of a Secret Service agent and a nurse, in the early 1980s while they were both attending Indiana University. The couple married at Our Lady of Sorrows in 1985.

Thomas graduated from Indiana University with a B.A. in 1987. He and Kendall had a son, Joshua, in 1988, and a daughter, Lauren, in 1991. Thomas has a third son from an earlier liaison, Marc Dones, born in 1986.

Thomas founded Isiah International LLC, an investment holdings company with Thomas as Chairman and CEO. It runs five companies: Isiah Real Estate, a development firm specializing in commercial properties; TAND Properties, a property management firm, private equity and asset management firm; Isiah Marketing, Advertising and Public Relations; and GRE3N Waste Removal. Thomas also co-owns the waste removal firm's sister company, RE3 Recycling, with his daughter, Lauren Thomas.

Thomas was involved in allegations about gambling, outlined in the 1997 book Money Players.

Paternity case
Two months before Thomas's marriage to Lynn Kendall in 1985, Jenni Dones, a woman from Bloomfield Hills, Michigan, filed a paternity lawsuit against Thomas claiming that she was pregnant after having had a three- or four-month "intimate, exclusive, ongoing relationship" with him. Her child, Marc E. T. Dones, was born in 1986. After a long-running legal dispute, Thomas agreed to pay a settlement of about $52,000 and provide a monthly payment of $2,765 until Marc Dones reached 18, with Marc getting a final lump-sum amount of $100,000 at 18. In a case Dones filed in 1995, she was able to get additional financial support for her child and their college education. Marc Dones has been described by the literary site thedetroiter.com as "a talented writer and poet". Marc Dones is the chief executive officer of the King County (WA) Regional Homelessness Authority.

Sexual harassment lawsuit
In January 2006, Anucha Browne Sanders, a former female executive with the New York Knicks, filed an employment and harassment lawsuit against The Madison Square Garden Company, alleging in part that Thomas had sexually harassed her in the workplace and that she had been fired in retaliation for complaining about the harassment. The case was then settled for $11.5 million.

Drug overdose
On October 24, 2008, Thomas was taken to White Plains Hospital Center near his New York City area home after accidentally taking an overdose of Lunesta, a form of sleep medication.

In an interview with ESPN, Thomas explained that he was so quiet about his hospitalization because he was focused on his family at the time.

Rivalries
In the 1985 NBA All-Star Game, Thomas was joined on the Eastern Conference squad by star rookie Michael Jordan. Jordan wound up attempting nine shots, relatively few for a starting player. Afterward, Thomas and his fellow veteran East players were accused of having planned to "freeze out" Jordan from their offense by not passing him the ball, supposedly out of spite over the attention Jordan was receiving. No player involved has ever confirmed that the freeze-out occurred, but the story has long been reported. Thomas has ridiculed the idea that he masterminded the supposed freeze-out as "ludicrous", pointing out that he was a relatively young player on a team that included Larry Bird, Julius Erving and Moses Malone. During Jordan's Hall of Fame induction, in which Thomas introduced John Stockton, who was also being inducted, Jordan dismissed the claims about a freeze-out having taken place, saying "I was just happy to be there, being the young guy surrounded by all these greats, I just wanted to prove myself and I hope that I did prove myself to you guys."

In 1987, following a playoff loss to the Boston Celtics, Thomas was asked if he agreed with Dennis Rodman's comments that Larry Bird was overrated because he was white; Thomas agreed that if Bird were black he "would be just another good guy" instead of being portrayed as the league's best player. Thomas later said he was joking and just supporting his teammate.

In the Eastern Conference Finals of the 1991 NBA playoffs, the two-time defending champion Detroit Pistons faced the Jordan-led Chicago Bulls in the playoffs for the fourth consecutive season. The Pistons had eliminated the Bulls in each of the three previous years, but this time they suffered a four-game sweep at the hands of the Bulls (who would win the first of three consecutive, and six overall, NBA championships between 1991 and 1998). The series was marked by a number of verbal and physical confrontations. With 7.9 seconds remaining in the fourth game, Laimbeer organized a walk-out and Thomas and all of his teammates—except Joe Dumars and John Salley—walked off the court, refusing to shake hands with the Bulls. In 1992, Thomas was passed over for the Dream Team apparently because of his strained relationship with Jordan.

In September 2009, during Jordan's Hall of Fame acceptance speech, Jordan thanked Thomas and others for giving him the motivation he needed to compete in the NBA.

Legacy and accolades
During his playing career, Thomas won an NCAA championship with Indiana in 1981 and NBA championships with Detroit in 1989 and 1990. He was selected as the Most Outstanding Player of the 1981 Final Four and the Most Valuable Player of the 1990 NBA Finals.  He was a consensus first-team All-American in 1980 and a 12-time NBA All-Star.

When Thomas retired as a player in 1994, he ranked third in NBA history with 9,061 assists and fifth in league history with 1,861 steals. As of 2022, his 9,061 assists rank ninth in NBA history, and his average of 9.3 assists per game ranks fifth.

As of 2020, Thomas also remains the Pistons' all-time career leader in minutes played (15,904), points scored (18,822), steals (1,861), and assists (9,061).

In February 1996, the Pistons retired Thomas's jersey No. 11.

In 1996, Thomas was named to the 50 Greatest Players in NBA History, selected upon the 50th anniversary of the founding of the NBA. In 2021, he was elected to the NBA 75th Anniversary Team.

Thomas has been inducted into the following halls of fame:

 In 1993, Thomas was inducted into the Indiana University Athletics Hall of Fame.
 In 1998, he was inducted along with Magic Johnson into the Michigan Sports Hall of Fame.
 In May 2000, he was elected to the Naismith Memorial Basketball Hall of Fame in his first year of eligibility.

Michael Jordan called Thomas the second greatest point guard ever, only behind Magic Johnson, and that despite his personal dislike of Thomas he respected his talent.

NBA career statistics

Regular season

|-
|style="text-align:left;"|
|style="text-align:left;"|Detroit
|72||72||33.8||.424||.288||.704||2.9||7.8||2.1||.2||17.0
|-
|style="text-align:left;"|
|style="text-align:left;"|Detroit
|81||81||38.2||.472||.288||.710||4.0||7.8||2.5||.4||22.9
|-
|style="text-align:left;"|
|style="text-align:left;"|Detroit
|style="background:#cfecec;"|82*||style="background:#cfecec;"|82*||36.7||.462||.338||.733||4.0||11.1||2.5||.4||21.3
|-
|style="text-align:left;"|
|style="text-align:left;"|Detroit
|81||81||38.1||.458||.257||.809||4.5|| style="background:#cfecec;"|13.9*||2.3||.3||21.2
|-
|style="text-align:left;"|
|style="text-align:left;"|Detroit
|77||77||36.2||.488||.310||.790||3.6||10.8||2.2||.3||20.9
|-
|style="text-align:left;"|
|style="text-align:left;"|Detroit
|81||81||37.2||.463||.194||.768||3.9||10.0||1.9||.2||20.6
|-
|style="text-align:left;"|
|style="text-align:left;"|Detroit
|81||81||36.1||.463||.309||.774||3.4||8.4||1.7||.2||19.5
|-
|style="text-align:left; background:#afe6ba;"|†
|style="text-align:left;"|Detroit
|80||76||36.6||.464||.273||.818||3.4||8.3||1.7||.3||18.2
|-
|style="text-align:left; background:#afe6ba;"|†
|style="text-align:left;"|Detroit
|81||81||37.0||.438||.309||.775||3.8||9.4||1.7||.2||18.4
|-
|style="text-align:left;"|
|style="text-align:left;"|Detroit
|48||46||34.5||.435||.292||.782||3.3||9.3||1.6||.2||16.2
|-
|style="text-align:left;"|
|style="text-align:left;"|Detroit
|78||78||37.4||.446||.291||.772||3.2||7.2||1.5||.2||18.5
|-
|style="text-align:left;"|
|style="text-align:left;"|Detroit
|79||79||37.0||.418||.308||.737||2.9||8.5||1.6||.2||17.6
|-
|style="text-align:left;"|
|style="text-align:left;"|Detroit
|58||56||30.2||.417||.310||.702||2.7||6.9||1.2||.1||14.8
|- class="sortbottom"
| style="text-align:center;" colspan="2"|Career
|979||971||36.3||.452||.290||.759||3.6||9.3||1.9||.3||19.2
|- class="sortbottom"
| style="text-align:center;" colspan="2"|All-Star
|11||10||28.9||.571||.400||.771||2.5||8.8||2.8||.0||16.8

Playoffs

|-
|style="text-align:left;"|1984
|style="text-align:left;"|Detroit
|5||5||39.6||.470||.333||.771||3.8||11.0||2.6||1.2||21.4
|-
|style="text-align:left;"|1985
|style="text-align:left;"|Detroit
|9||9||39.4||.500||.400||.758||5.2||11.2||2.1||.4||24.3
|-
|style="text-align:left;"|1986
|style="text-align:left;"|Detroit
|4||4||40.8||.451||.000||.667||5.5||12.0||2.3||.8||26.5
|-
|style="text-align:left;"|1987
|style="text-align:left;"|Detroit
|15||15||37.5||.451||.303||.755||4.5||8.7||2.6||.3||24.1
|-
|style="text-align:left;"|1988
|style="text-align:left;"|Detroit
|23||23||39.6||.437||.295||.828||4.7||8.7||2.9||.3||21.9
|-
|style="text-align:left; background:#afe6ba;"|1989†
|style="text-align:left;"|Detroit
|17||17||37.2||.412||.267||.740||4.3||8.3||1.6||.2||18.2
|-
|style="text-align:left; background:#afe6ba;"|1990†
|style="text-align:left;"|Detroit
|20||20||37.9||.463||.471||.794||5.5||8.2||2.2||.4||20.5
|-
|style="text-align:left;"|1991
|style="text-align:left;"|Detroit
|13||11||33.5||.403||.273||.725||4.2||8.5||1.0||.2||13.5
|-
|style="text-align:left;"|1992
|style="text-align:left;"|Detroit
|5||5||40.0||.338||.364||.786||5.2||7.4||1.0||.0||14.0
|- class="sortbottom"
| style="text-align:center;" colspan="2"|Career
|111||109||38.0||.441||.346||.769||4.7||8.9||2.1||.3||20.4

Head coaching record

NBA

|-
| style="text-align:left;"|Indiana
| style="text-align:left;"|
| 82||41||41|||| style="text-align:center;"|4th in Central||4||1||3||
| style="text-align:center;"|Lost in First round
|-
| style="text-align:left;"|Indiana
| style="text-align:left;"|
| 82||42||40|||| style="text-align:center;"|4th in Central||5||2||3||
| style="text-align:center;"|Lost in First round
|-
| style="text-align:left;"|Indiana
| style="text-align:left;"|
| 82||48||34|||| style="text-align:center;"|2nd in Central||6||2||4||
| style="text-align:center;"|Lost in First round
|-
| style="text-align:left;"|New York
| style="text-align:left;"|
| 82||33||49|||| style="text-align:center;"|4th in Atlantic||—||—||—||—
| style="text-align:center;"|Missed playoffs
|-
| style="text-align:left;"|New York
| style="text-align:left;"|
| 82||23||59|||| style="text-align:center;"|5th in Atlantic||—||—||—||—
| style="text-align:center;"|Missed playoffs
|- class="sortbottom"
| style="text-align:left;" colspan="2"|Career
| 410||187||223|||| ||15||5||10||||

College

See also
 Michigan Sports Hall of Fame
 List of National Basketball Association career assists leaders
 List of National Basketball Association career steals leaders
 List of National Basketball Association career turnovers leaders
 List of National Basketball Association career playoff assists leaders
 List of National Basketball Association career playoff steals leaders
 List of National Basketball Association career playoff turnovers leaders
 List of National Basketball Association players with most assists in a game
 List of National Basketball Association franchise career scoring leaders

References

External links

 Isiah International official website
 
 FIU profile (2011)
 NBA profile (2006)
 Historical profile on NBA.com
 

1961 births
Living people
20th-century African-American sportspeople
21st-century African-American people
African-American basketball coaches
African-American basketball players
African-American Catholics
African-American sports executives and administrators
All-American college men's basketball players
American expatriate basketball people in Canada
American men's basketball players
American sports executives and administrators
Basketball coaches from Illinois
Basketball players at the 1979 Pan American Games
Basketball players from Chicago
Businesspeople in the cannabis industry
Congressional Gold Medal recipients
Detroit Pistons draft picks
Detroit Pistons players
FIU Panthers men's basketball coaches
Indiana Hoosiers men's basketball players
Indiana Pacers head coaches
McDonald's High School All-Americans
Medalists at the 1979 Pan American Games
Naismith Memorial Basketball Hall of Fame inductees
National Basketball Association All-Stars
National Basketball Association broadcasters
National Basketball Association players with retired numbers
National Basketball Players Association presidents
New York Knicks head coaches
Pan American Games gold medalists for the United States
Pan American Games medalists in basketball
Parade High School All-Americans (boys' basketball)
Point guards
Toronto Raptors executives
UC Berkeley Graduate School of Education alumni